Stenotrema is a genus of air-breathing land snails, terrestrial pulmonate gastropod mollusks in the family Polygyridae. These are typically small to medium-sized snails, with a velvety or hairy shell surface, and a narrow aperture which is usually closely guarded by well-developed "teeth".

Distribution 
The genus occurs throughout most of North America, from Alaska, though Canada and the United States, into Mexico.

Species 
Genus Stenotrema contains the following species and subspecies:

Stenotrema altispira (Pilsbry, 1894)
Stenotrema angellum Hubricht, 1858
Stenotrema barbigerum (Redfield, 1856)
Stenotrema blandianum (Pilsbry, 1903)
Stenotrema brevipila (Clap, 1907)
Stenotrema burringtoni Grimm, 1971
Stenotrema calvescens Hubricht, 1961
Stenotrema cohuttense (Clapp, 1914)
Stenotrema deceptum (Clapp, 1905)
Stenotrema depilatum (Pilsbry, 1895)
Stenotrema edgarianum (Lea, 1841)
Stenotrema edvardsi (Bland, 1856)
Stenotrema exodon (Pilsbry, 1900)
Stenotrema exodon turbinella (Clench & Archer, 1933)
Stenotrema florida Pilsbry, 1940
Stenotrema hirsutum (Say, 1817)
Stenotrema hirsutum barbatum (Clapp, 1904)
 Stenotrema hubrichti Pilsbry, 1940 / Euchemotrema hubrichti (Pilsbry, 1940)
Stenotrema labrosum (Bland 1862)
Stenotrema magnifumosum (Pilsbry, 1900)
Stenotrema maxillatum (Gould, 1848)
Stenotrema pilsbryi (Ferriss, 1900) - Rich Mountain Slitmouth
Stenotrema pilula (Pilsbry, 1900)
Stenotrema simile Grimm, 1971
Stenotrema spinosum (Lea, 1830)
Stenotrema stenotrema (Pfeiffer, 1842)
Stenotrema unciferum (Pilsbry, 1900)
Stenotrema unciferum caddoense (Archer, 1935)
Stenotrema waldense Archer, 1938

See Euchemotrema for other closely related taxa, many of which are sometimes placed in Stenotrema.

References

External links 

Polygyridae
Taxa named by Constantine Samuel Rafinesque
Taxonomy articles created by Polbot